Strandiata is a genus of longhorn beetles of the subfamily Lamiinae, containing the following species:

 Strandiata abyssinica (Breuning, 1935)
 Strandiata lizleri  Adlbauer, 2015
 Strandiata monikae Adlbauer, 2008
 Strandiata renominata Vitali F. & Vitali C., 2012

References

Phrissomini